Roberto Luis Fresnedoso Prieto (born 15 January 1973), known simply as Roberto, is a Spanish former footballer who played as a midfielder.

Club career
Born in Toledo, Castile-La Mancha, Roberto moved to Catalonia in his teens. He started his football career in the area, first with Girona FC then moving to RCD Español, spending his first years with its farm team CE L'Hospitalet. He made his first appearance with the main squad in the 1992–93 season, in an eventual La Liga relegation.

After solid performances in the following years – this included 36 games with five goals in the 1994–95 campaign, as Espanyol qualified for the UEFA Cup straight out of the second division – Roberto signed with Atlético Madrid. Never an undisputed starter in seven years, he did manage 31 matches with three goals scored in his first, where the capital side won the double. He was also loaned in January 1998 to former club Espanyol.

An all-around midfielder, Roberto retired in 2005 after successive spells with UD Salamanca, Real Murcia, Rayo Vallecano and Cultural y Deportiva Leonesa (the latter in the third tier). In 2010 he returned to Atlético as a manager, being appointed at its youth sides.

Honours

Club
Atlético Madrid
La Liga: 1995–96
Copa del Rey: 1995–96
Segunda División: 2001–02

Espanyol
Segunda División: 1993–94

International
Spain U21
UEFA European Under-21 Championship runner-up: 1996

References

External links

Espanyol archives 

1973 births
Living people
Sportspeople from Toledo, Spain
Spanish footballers
Footballers from Castilla–La Mancha
Association football midfielders
La Liga players
Segunda División players
Segunda División B players
Girona FC players
CE L'Hospitalet players
RCD Espanyol footballers
Atlético Madrid footballers
UD Salamanca players
Real Murcia players
Rayo Vallecano players
Cultural Leonesa footballers
Spain under-21 international footballers
Spain under-23 international footballers
Olympic footballers of Spain
Footballers at the 1996 Summer Olympics
Spanish football managers